Ocean and Lee is a light rail stop on the Muni Metro K Ingleside line, located between the Westwood Park and Ingleside neighborhoods of San Francisco, California. The stop consists of two side platforms, with the eastbound (outbound) platform located on Ocean Avenue west of the intersection with Lee Street, and vice versa. It originally opened in 1895 on the United Railroads 12 line; K Ingleside service began in 1945.

History 

The private Market Street Railway opened a branch — built in just six days — of its Mission Street line along Ocean Avenue to Victoria Street on December 4, 1895 to serve the new Ingleside Racetrack. The line was extended to the Ingleside House (where Ocean Avenue now meets Junipero Serra Boulevard) shortly thereafter. The 1906 earthquake damaged many cable car and streetcar lines; the URR resumed service on the Ocean Avenue (12) line on May 6, 1906.

On November 25, 1918, the city and the struggling URR signed the "Parkside Agreements", which allowed Muni streetcars to use URR trackage on Junipero Serra Boulevard, Ocean Avenue, and Taraval Street, in exchange for a cash payment and shared maintenance costs. The K Ingleside line was extended south on Junipero Serra Boulevard and east on Ocean to Ocean and Miramar on February 21, 1919. Miramar was the terminus of the line until May 18, 1919, when it was extended east on Ocean Avenue and south on Brighton Avenue to Grafton Avenue.

The city purchased the private company (renamed Market Street Railway in 1921) in 1944; route 12 service was removed from Ocean Avenue on April 8, 1945, leaving just the K Ingleside. On April 8, 1945, route 12 service was removed from Ocean Avenue, while every other K Ingleside car was extended on Ocean Avenue and Onondaga Street to Mission Street to provide a direction connection to route . In 1952, Muni constructed a loop for the K with a separate busway for the 12 (converted to bus in 1948) on city property north of Ocean Avenue and west of Phelan Avenue, adjacent to the then-new City College. The Brighton Avenue trackage was retired and replaced with the new Phelan Loop on May 18, 1952; the alternate service to Mission Street was cut back to the loop on October 10, 1952.

In the 1970s, Muni rebuilt the non-revenue trackage for regular service so that K Ingleside service could be extended to the new Balboa Park station. The first revenue service to Balboa Park was on April 23, 1979, although service past Phelan Loop did not run at all times until March 17, 1981. Phelan Loop was then retired for streetcar service, replaced with platforms on Ocean Avenue at Lee Street. However, Muni buses continued using the bus loop because Balboa Park station did not include a bus terminal. By the early 2000s, the loop was part of a section of Ocean Avenue deemed "bleak and uninteresting", in contrast to the commercial district to the west. In 2001, as part of a planning process for the Balboa Park area, the city proposed to build a housing development and public open space on the loop parcel, with buses using a new loop behind an adjacent fire station closer to Phelan Avenue.

The line was closed and replaced by buses from February 2001 to June 7, 2003 for the Ocean Avenue Reconstruction and Improvement Project, a major street repaving and utility replacement project. Muni built new side platforms (traffic islands) on the near side of the cross street, with a short mini-high platform providing access to people with disabilities. In July 2010, Muni received a $6.8 million federal grant to fund the loop relocation. The new loop opened on May 6, 2013 as the terminal for the / and  routes, which enter the loop from Ocean Avenue and exit onto Phelan Avenue. Housing was soon built on the old loop site; the new open space, Unity Plaza, opened next to the loop in October 2016.

References

External links 

SFMTA – Ocean Ave & Lee St inbound and outbound
SFBay Transit (unofficial) – Ocean Ave & Lee St

Muni Metro stations
Railway stations in the United States opened in 1895